Mariano Gustavo Soso (born 30 April 1981) is an Argentine football manager, currently in charge of Peruvian club Melgar.

Managerial career
Born in Rosario, Santa Fe, Soso started his career in Newell's Old Boys' youth categories. In 2009, he became Claudio Vivas' assistant at Argentinos Juniors for six months, before joining Javier Torrente's staff at Libertad, Cerro Porteño, Newell's and Nacional, under the same role.

In 2013, after one season as Hernán Lisi's assistant at Unión Temuco, Soso rejoined Vivas' staff at Sporting Cristal. He remained at the club even after Vivas' departure, being Daniel Ahmed's assistant as the club lifted the 2014 Torneo Descentralizado.

On 11 December 2014, Soso was appointed manager of Real Garcilaso for the upcoming season. Sacked the following 10 August after losing the 2015 Apertura, he returned to Cristal on 4 January 2016, being now first team manager. 

On 19 December 2016, a day after winning the league title, Soso resigned from Cristal. The following 26 June, he was presented at Gimnasia La Plata, but decided to leave the club on 28 December.

On 22 May 2018, after nearly six months without a club, Soso took over Ecuadorian Serie A side Emelec. He announced his departure from the club on 14 April of the following year, and was appointed at the helm of Defensa y Justicia on 5 June 2019. He left the club in mid-January 2020.

On 16 March 2020, Soso was appointed manager at San Lorenzo. He resigned the following 11 January, and was named in charge of Chilean side O'Higgins on 10 December 2021.

Soso left O'Higgins on a mutual agreement on 7 November 2022, and was appointed Melgar manager the following 14 March.

Honours
Sporting Cristal
Torneo Descentralizado: 2016

References

External links

1981 births
Living people
Sportspeople from Rosario, Santa Fe
Argentine football managers
Argentine expatriate football managers
Argentine Primera División managers
Chilean Primera División managers
Club de Gimnasia y Esgrima La Plata managers
Defensa y Justicia managers
San Lorenzo de Almagro managers
Sporting Cristal managers
C.S. Emelec managers
O'Higgins F.C. managers
Cusco FC managers
FBC Melgar managers
Argentine expatriate sportspeople in Chile
Argentine expatriate sportspeople in Peru
Argentine expatriate sportspeople in Ecuador
Expatriate football managers in Chile
Expatriate football managers in Peru
Expatriate football managers in Ecuador